Alan may refer to:

People
Alan (surname), an English and Turkish surname
Alan (given name), an English given name 
List of people with given name Alan

Following are people commonly referred to solely by "Alan" or by a homonymous name.
Alan (Chinese singer) (born 1987), female Chinese singer of Tibetan ethnicity, active in both China and Japan
Alan (Mexican singer) (born 1973), Mexican singer and actor
Alan (wrestler) (born 1975), a.k.a. Gato Eveready, who wrestles in Asistencia Asesoría y Administración
Alan (footballer, born 1979) (Alan Osório da Costa Silva), Brazilian footballer
Alan (footballer, born 1998) (Alan Cardoso de Andrade), Brazilian footballer
Alan I, King of Brittany (died 907), "the Great"
Alan II, Duke of Brittany (c. 900–952)
Alan III, Duke of Brittany(997–1040)
Alan IV, Duke of Brittany (c. 1063–1119), a.k.a. Alan Fergant ("the Younger" in Breton language)
Alan of Tewkesbury, 12th century abbott
Alan of Lynn (c. 1348–1423), 15th century monk

Saint Alan or Alain
Alan of Lavaur, or Elan
Alain de la Roche (c. 1428–1475), or Alanus de Rupe, canonized saint, "Alan of the Rock"
Alain de Solminihac (1593-1659), French Catholic religious reformer and bishop of Cahors

Fictional characters
Alan (Sesame Street) in the television series Sesame Street
Alan Partridge, a comedy character portrayed by Steve Coogan
Alan (Modern Toss) in the television series Modern Toss
Alan "Squid", a character in the novel Holes and its film adaption
Alan, the main antagonist in the video game Kya: Dark Lineage

Places
Alan, Haute-Garonne, a commune in France
Alan, Iran (disambiguation), places in Iran
Alan, Russia, name of several rural localities in Russia

Alan, Şemdinli, a village in Turkey

Other meanings
ALAN, an Italian bicycle manufacturer 
Alan (automobile), a short-lived German automobile
Alan (crater), a crater on the Moon
Alan (mythical creature), a race of winged spirits from Tinguian folklore
Alans, nomadic tribes from Asia who migrated westward in late antiquity
Cyclone Alan, a tropical storm

See also

Alans, an ancient and medieval Iranian nomadic pastoral people of the North Caucasus
Alen (disambiguation)
Allan (disambiguation)
Alleine
Allen (disambiguation)